M. californica  may refer to:
 Malacothrix californica, the California desertdandelion, a flowering plant species native to California and Baja California
 Melica californica, the California melic, a grass species native to Oregon and California
 Metzgeria californica, a sea snail species
 Minuartia californica, the California sandwort, a flowering plant species native to  Oregon and California
 Muhlenbergia californica, the California muhly, an uncommon grass species endemic to southern California
 Myliobatis californica, the bat ray, a fish species found in the eastern Pacific Ocean, between the Oregon coast and the Gulf of California
 Myrica californica, the California bayberry, California wax myrtle or Pacific wax, an evergreen shrub or small tree species native to the Pacific Ocean coast from Vancouver Island south to California

See also
 List of Latin and Greek words commonly used in systematic names#C